The FC Basel 1940–41 season was the forty-eighth season since the club's foundation on 15 November 1893. FC Basel played their home games in the Landhof in the district Wettstein in Kleinbasel. Albert Besse was the club's chairman for the second consecutive season.

Overview 
Former Swiss international Eugen Rupf was appointed as manager. Basel played 27 matches in this season. 14 of these matches were in the 1. Liga, two in the play-offs, four in the Swiss Cup and seven were friendly matches. Of these friendlies three were played at home in the Landhof, four were away games. Five friendly games were won and two ended in a defeat.

Despite having been 1. Liga champions the previous season, Basel played this season in the 1. Liga as well because there had been no promotion to the top tier of Swiss football due to World War II. This season, however, two promotions were planned. 24 teams competed in the 1.Liga, which was divided into three regional groups. Basel were allocated to the Central Group, together with local rivals Concordia Basel and FC Birsfelden. The further teams in this group were Aarau, FC Bern, US Bienne-Boujean and Fribourg. Basel and Aarau dominated their group, both teams winning 11 of their 14 group games. Basel suffered one sole defeat, and that against Aarau, but won the group with 24 points, one point above them, because they had been defeated twice. But in the promotion play-offs Basel were defeated by Cantonal Neuchatel and drew the game with Zürich. Their two play-off opponents were thus promoted and Basel remained for another season in the 1 Liga.

Basel joined the Swiss Cup in the 2nd principal round and were drawn at home to and beat Old Boys 4 – 3. In round three Basel beat lower tier FC Allschwil and were drawn against higher tier Nordstern Basel in round four. After a 3 – 3 draw, Basel were knocked out when they lost the replay.

Players 
The following is the list of the Basel first team squad during the season 1940–41. The list includes players that were in the squad the day the season started on 1 September 1940 but subsequently left the club after that date.

 
 
 

 

  

Players who left the squad

Results

Legend

Friendly matches

Pre and mid-season

Winter break

Nationalliga

League matches

League table

Play-offs

Swiss Cup

See also 
 History of FC Basel
 List of FC Basel players
 List of FC Basel seasons

References

Sources 
 Rotblau: Jahrbuch Saison 2014/2015. Publisher: FC Basel Marketing AG. 
 Die ersten 125 Jahre. Publisher: Josef Zindel im Friedrich Reinhardt Verlag, Basel. 
 FCB team 1940/41 at fcb-archiv.ch
 Switzerland 1940/41 by Erik Garin at Rec.Sport.Soccer Statistics Foundation

External links
 FC Basel official site

FC Basel seasons
Basel